Jakob Lorber (22 July 1800 – 23 August 1864) was a Christian mystic and visionary  from the Duchy of Styria, who promoted liberal Universalism. He referred to himself as "God's scribe". He wrote that on 15 March 1840 he began hearing an "inner voice" from the region of his heart and thereafter transcribed what it said. By the time of his death 24 years later he had written manuscripts equivalent to more than 10,000 pages in print.

His writings were published posthumously as amounting to a "New Revelation", and the contemporary "Lorber movement" forms one of the major neo-revelationist sects, mostly active in German-speaking Europe, although parts of Lorber's writings have also been translated into more than 20 languages (according to the website of the Lorber Publisher). Its adherents have not formed a sect or cult, but rather continue in their denominations.

Biography
Jakob Lorber was born in Kanischa, a small village in the Jahring parish, Duchy of Styria (now Kaniža pri Jarenini in Lower Styria, Slovenia) to a peasant family, Michael Lorber and his wife Maria, née Tautscher.
He was trained as a village teacher.

A brief biography by his friend Karl Gottfried Ritter von Leitner indicates that Lorber was an uncomplicated person.

He was observed while writing by well-educated men in the city of Graz, such as Dr. Carl-Friedrich Zimpel, the mayor of Graz, Anton Hüttenbrenner, his brother the composer Anselm Hüttenbrenner, the poet and Secretary to the Estates Karl Gottfried von Leitner, Dr. Anton Kammerhuber, Leopold Cantily, pharmacist of Graz, and others. Too, these men verified his simple life. Lorber was open and friendly regarding his transcriptions yet found himself involved in small intrigues designed to prove that he was a fake. For instance, the wife of one of his friends was certain that Lorber had studied the material he was pretending to hear from the inner voice, but she never found the scientific books she had supposed he was hiding, eventually finding his only research material to be a single copy of the Bible.

He had musical talent and learned the violin, taking lessons from the virtuoso violinist Paganini, and once giving a violin concert at the La Scala Opera House in Milan. In 1840 –the same year he claimed to begin hearing the inner voice– Lorber was offered the position of assistant musical director at the theater in Trieste. He claimed that the inner voice, however, directed him to decline and take up a life of solitude instead. Lorber's writings reveal that the inner voice spoke freely in first person as the voice of Jesus Christ.

Prose style 
Lorber's prose has been described as compelling, moving some readers  to compare it with writings by other mystics such as Emanuel Swedenborg, Jakob Boehme and Rudolf Steiner. Lorber himself makes reference to Swedenborg, in his book From Hell to Heaven (book 2 chapter 104 verse 4) and in The Spiritual Sun (vol. 1, chap. 16).

The Great Gospel of John

In the Great Gospel of John, the narrator, Jesus, explains that he is the creator of the material universe, which was designed both as a confinement of Satan, and so he could take upon himself the condition of a man. He says he did this to inspire his children who could otherwise not perceive him in his primordial form as a spirit. He gives descriptions of the eons of time involved in creating the Earth. He does so in a manner similar to the modern theory of evolution all the way up to the point several thousand years ago when Jesus placed Adam upon the Earth, which at the time contained man-like creatures who did not have free will, being simply the most clever of the animals.

In a comprehensive manner the Great Gospel of John continually emphasizes the importance of free will. In this book, heaven and hell are presented as conditions already within us, expressed according to whether we live in harmony or contrary to God's divine order. The Great Gospel of John also states that the gospels of John and Matthew were written at the time of the events they chronicle; for instance, Lorber writes that Jesus specifically told Matthew to take notes during the Sermon on the Mount. Such an account seems at first contrary to the current consensus of biblical scholarship which typically places the authorship of Matthew some years after the resurrection of Jesus Christ and that of John even later. However, in the Great Gospel of John the narrator explains how this happened. He claims that there were many writers who described him, including several authors named Matthew, who all wrote similarly over a period of many years.

Paul's epistle to the Laodiceans

Lorber claimed to have heard by the inner voice, in 1844, the "lost" letter Paul wrote to the assembly of the Laodiceans, as referred to in Colossians 4:16. 

Several texts purporting to be the "lost" letter survive, notably one brief text preserved in medieval Vulgate manuscripts, attested from the 6th century. Another candidate is attributed to Marcion, listed in the Muratorian fragment. Marcion's text is lost, and the Vulgate text is widely recognized as pseudepigraphical, and was decreed uncanonical by the Council of Florence of 1439–43. There is no resemblance between the letters produced by Lorber via the inner voice and the original manuscripts that survived. Publisher of this Lorber manuscript claims that the letter's being lost reflects the falling away of the Church from true Christianity.

Reception

Publication
Lorber posthumously attracted a following, and his writings were published and frequently reprinted, mostly with Lorber & Turm, a dedicated publisher based in Bietigheim-Bissingen, Germany.
The original manuscripts and copies of some of the manuscripts by close friends of Lorber are still preserved in the archives of the Lorber & Turm publisher.

The German philosopher E.F. Schumacher refers to the New Revelation (NR) in his book "A Guide for the Perplexed" as follows: "They (the books of the NR) contain many strange things which are unacceptable to modern mentality, but at the same time contain such plethora of high wisdom and insight that it would be difficult to find anything more impressive in the whole of world literature. Lorber's books, at the same time, are full of statements on scientific matters which flatly contradicted the sciences of his time and anticipated a great deal of modern physics and astronomy... There is no rational explanation for the range, profundity and precision of their contents."

Lorber's work is divided into several books which, in aggregate, are called the New Revelation.

His Great Gospel of John was published in ten volumes and frequently reprinted, the 8th edition dating to 1996.
The Gospel of Jacob appeared in a 12th edition in 2006.

Lorber's works have partially been translated into English, appearing with Merkur Publishing.

Adherents

Lorber and his friends were members of the Roman Catholic Church, and Lorber's revelations asked them not to leave the church, but to convince it of the genuinely divine nature of the "New Revelation" by leading exemplary lives. However, the First Vatican Council of 1869/1870 placed Lorber's writings on the Index of Forbidden Books. Occultist Leopold Engel was one of Lorber's followers, and also wrote an 11th volume, claiming to be a follow up to Lorber's The Great Gospel of John close to 30 years after Lorber's death. 

There is a movement of adherents of Lorber's writings (Lorber-Bewegung, Lorberianer, Lorber-Gesellschaften), mostly active in German-speaking Europe. There is no organizational structure beyond small regional circles, While there is no accurate estimate of the total number of adherents, it likely exceeds 100,000 worldwide.

Status in the Church of Christ with the Elijah Message
In one of the sacred books of all the three factions of the Church of Christ with the Elijah Message, Word of the Lord Brought to Mankind by an Angel, Lorber is named as one of the servants of God from the German speaking area.

Criticism
One main point of criticism of Lorber's works was the use of the first person as if the writings were dictated by Jesus Christ himself.<ref name="Weltanschauungsfragen, p. 21">Evangelische Zentralstelle für Weltanschauungsfragen, Ich habe euch noch viel zu sagen …”, p. 21</ref>
Some statements can be considered anti-semitic,Andreas Fincke, Jesus Christus im Werk Jakob Lorbers: Untersuchungen zum Jesusbild und zur Christologie einer "Neuoffenbarung", 162ff. and Lorber was in fact noted by the anti-semitic proponents of "Ariosophy" racial mysticism during the 1920, e.g. by Lanz von Liebenfels, who in 1926 published on Jakob Lorber as "the greatest ariosophic medium of the modern era" (das grösste ariosophische Medium der Neuzeit) Then again it is said in the books of Lorber, that salvation comes to all men from the Jews, and that one should in all truth return to Judaism and that the God of the Jews is the only true, eternal God. It is also said to be the will of God or Jesus that all men should be friends, whether they are Jews or gentiles.

Kurt Hutten, former chairman of the Evangelische Zentralstelle für Weltanschauungsfragen (EZW, an apologetic institution of the Evangelical Church in Germany) has identified Swedenborg and Lorber as recipients of equally valid private revelation. Official statements of the EZW are more skeptical, assuming psychological explanations for Lorber's revelations. EZW points to a 1966 Berne dissertation by Antoinette Stettler-Schär which diagnosed Lorber with paranoid schizophrenia. This diagnosis has been dismissed by Bernhard Grom, who diagnoses self-induced hallucination. Andreas Finke, vice-chairman of the EZW, concludes that the content of Lorber's revelations reflect both the period during which they were written down and the knowledge of their author, identifying them as "pious poetry in the best sense of the term, but not divine dictation."

BibliographyDas grosse Evangelium Johannis (The Great Gospel of John), first edition 1871, 10 volumes, Lorber-Verlag, 1996 reprint:  ff.
"condensed version" in English, Zluhan Verlag (1985), .Die Haushaltung Gottes  (The Household of God), 3 vols., Lorber-Verlag, 5th ed. (1981), .
 English translation:   Zluhan Verlag (1995) .Die geistige Sonne, 2 vols., Lorber-Verlag, 9th ed. (1996), .Die natürliche Sonne Bietigheim Württemberg, Neu-Salems-Verlag (1928)Die Heilkraft des Sonnenlichtes, Lorber-Verlag, 2006 reprint: .Jenseits der Schwelle: Sterbeszenen, Lorber-Verlag, 2004 reprint (9th ed.): .Die Jugend Jesu. Das Jakobus-Evangelium, 12th ed. (1996), .Die Fliege: Einblicke in die Wunder der Schöpfung , Zluhan Verlag, 7th ed. (2000), .Bischof Martin: Die Entwicklung einer Seele im Jenseits , 3rd ed. (2003), .Die drei Tage im Tempel , Zluhan Verlag, 10th ed. (1995), .Naturgeheimnisse: Das Naturgeschehen und sein geistiger Hintergrund , Lorber-Verlag, 3rd ed. (1994), .Die Wiederkunft Christi: Ein Entwicklungsbild der Menschheit , Zluhan Verlag, 5th ed. (2000), .Paulus' Brief an die Gemeinde in Laodizea, Zluhan Verlag; 6th ed. (1993), .Briefwechsel Jesu mit Abgarus Ukkama von Edessa, .Der Saturn: Darstellung dieses Planeten samt Ring und Monden und seiner Lebewesen, Lorber-Verlag, 4th ed. (2009), .Erde und Mond, Zluhan Verlag, 2000 reprint of 4th ed. (1953), .Der Großglockner: Ein Evangelium der Berge, Zluhan Verlag, 7th ed. (2009), .
 Ritter von Leitner:Jakob Lorber, der Steiermärkische Theosoph Junge Michael:Dokumentation um Jakob Lorber. Books on Demand GmbH, 2004, 
  Hutten Kurt:Seher – Grübler – Enthusiasten. Das Buch der traditionellen Sekten und religiösen Sonderbewegungen. Quell Verlag, Stuttgart 1997, 
 Pöhlmann Matthias (ed.): "Ich habe euch noch viel zu sagen ...": Gottesboten – Propheten – Neuoffenbarer. EZW-Texte 169. Evangelische Zentralstelle für Weltanschauungsfragen, Berlin 2003, ISSN 0085-0357
 Obst Helmut:Apostel und Propheten der Neuzeit. Vandenhoeck & Ruprecht, Göttingen 2000, 233–264
 Gassmann Lothar:Kleines Sekten-HandbuchMago-Bucher, 2005, 92–95
 Stettler Antoinette-Schär:Jakob Lorber: Sektenstifters eines Psychopathologie zur''. Dissertation an der Medizinischen Fakultät der Universität Bern, 1966
 Johanna Böhm: Eine kritische Durchsicht.

References

External links
 
 Lorber's works in English at the Internet Archive
God's Scribe, includes web versions and e-books of Lorber's work.
The New Revelation of Jesus Christ through Jakob Lorber and Gottfried Mayerhofer
The New Revelation on the Internet – in English, German and other languages
Jakob Lorber Online Search Database
Lorber-weblinks
Jakob Lorber: Letter of St. Paul to the Assembly of the Laodiceans
The Great Gospel of John Vol. 1–10 in English 

1800 births
1864 deaths
19th-century Christian mystics
Roman Catholic mystics
Enlightenment philosophers
Austrian Christians